Persipas stands for Persatuan Sepakbola Indonesia Paser (en: Football Association of Indonesia Paser). Persipas Paser is an  Indonesian football club based in Paser Regency, East Kalimantan. Club played in Liga 3.

References

External links
Liga-Indonesia.co.id

Paser Regency
Football clubs in East Kalimantan
Football clubs in Indonesia